Playhouse Village, (formerly known as Playhouse District) a neighborhood in Pasadena, California, is bordered by Interstate 210 to the north, California Boulevard to the south, Los Robles Avenue to the west, and Hudson Avenue to the east, with a panhandle-like extension to Wilson Avenue. The district is also notable for its manhattanization, the legacy of extensive urbanization from the 1960s to the 1980s.

Landmarks

At Playhouse Village's center is the district's namesake, the Pasadena Playhouse, as well as Vroman's Bookstore, Pasadena's oldest operating independent bookstore, and Laemmle's Playhouse 7. At the neighborhood's east end is the Ice House comedy club and art-house Boston Court Pasadena. Fuller Theological Seminary is located at the western end.

At the corner of Colorado Boulevard and Oakland Ave. is the Pasadena Star News building. The newspaper started publication in 1884. The building now houses New School of Cooking's Pasadena location and a 24 Hour Fitness location.

Additionally, the First United Methodist Church and Pasadena Presbyterian Church, on the former home of KPPC-FM, are located on Colorado Blvd.

The USC Pacific Asia Museum, which started in 1971, is located on North Los Robles Avenue. It has a collection of 15,000 pieces of Asia and the Pacific Islands art work.

Education
Playhouse Village is served by McKinley School and Blair High School

Transportation
The Metro Gold Line operates a station on Lake Avenue, just north of the neighborhood. Playhouse Village is served by Metro Local lines 177, 180, 662 and 686. It is also served by Pasadena Transit routes 10 and 20, and Foothill Transit route 187.

References

Neighborhoods in Pasadena, California